Columbus County Municipal Airport  is a county-owned, public-use airport in Columbus County, North Carolina, United States. It is located three nautical miles (6 km) south of the central business district of Whiteville, North Carolina. This airport is included in the National Plan of Integrated Airport Systems for 2011–2015, which categorized it as a general aviation facility.

Although most U.S. airports use the same three-letter location identifier for the FAA and IATA, this airport is assigned CPC by the FAA but has no designation from the IATA (which assigned CPC to Chapelco Airport in San Martín de los Andes, Neuquén Province, Argentina). The airport's ICAO identifier is KCPC.

Facilities and aircraft 
Columbus County Municipal Airport covers an area of 300 acres (121 ha) at an elevation of 99 feet (30 m) above mean sea level. It has one runway designated 6/24 with an asphalt surface measuring 5,500 by 75 feet (1,676 x 23 m).

For the 12-month period ending March 17, 2012, the airport had 16,700 aircraft operations, an average of 45 per day: 81% general aviation, 13% air taxi, and 6% military. At that time there were 27 aircraft based at this airport: 78% single-engine, 4% multi-engine, and 19% helicopter.

References

External links 
 Columbus County Municipal Airport at Columbus County website
  at North Carolina DOT airport guide
 Aerial image as of March 1999 from USGS The National Map
 

Airports in North Carolina
Buildings and structures in Columbus County, North Carolina
Transportation in Columbus County, North Carolina